KHK may refer to:
 Kappa Eta Kappa
 Ketohexokinase
 Katholieke Hogeschool Kempen